Sagarika (also known as Sagarika Mukherjee in birth name, Saag in nickname and Sagarika Da Costa in maiden name) is an Indian singer and actress. She sang several songs in Hindi, Assamese and Bengali. Her Song list is given below:

Hindi film songs

Hindi non-film songs

Hindi television songs

Assamese film songs

Assamese non-film songs

Bengali film songs

Bengali non-film songs

References

Sagarika